The Colonel Light Gardens Football Club is an Australian rules football club that plays in Division 5, Division 5 Reserves and C-Grade Division 5 of the South Australian Amateur Football League. They are known as the 'Lions'.

History 
The club was founded by the merger of Colonel Light Western (1927-1930, South Adelaide District & YMCA Association) and Mortlock Park (1927-1930, Mid Southern Association) in 1931. For its first two seasons of playing in the SAAFL, the club applied to join the South Australian National Football League. The club was admitted to the newly formed SA National Junior Football Association before moving back to the SAAFL in 1937. In 1938, it was represented at state level by Sturt player Gil Langley who was one of the five state players the club produced. The Lions rose to Division 1 and contested the finals three seasons in a row while the club was also fielding teams in the Sturt District Association.

During the 1960s, Colonel Light Gardens saw a downfall, dropping down to Division 2 and then to Division 4 in the 1970s before moving again to the Glenelg South league in 1976. The Lions remained there until 1986 when it combined with the Kenilworth Football Club to form Kenilworth-Colonel Light and thus going back to the SAAFL. The merger only lasted for five years, with the Lions reverting to Colonel Light Gardens in 1991. In 1995 it was forced to share its home ground, Mortlock Park, with the Goodwood Indians Baseball Club who had their own facilities on the site, with the Mitcham Council ultimately ceasing the club's uses with the clubrooms for events due to complaints from local residents.

The club has a strong junior player base and still continues to field junior teams in SANFL Juniors and senior teams in the Adelaide Footy League.

A-Grade Premierships 

 1932 = Division 2
 1949 = Division 2
 1962 = Division 4
 1993 = Division 6
 1995 = Division 5
 2007 = Division 7

References

External links 

 Colonel Light Gardens Lions Football Club Website

Australian rules football clubs in South Australia
Adelaide Footy League clubs